Pain Velayat Rural District may refer to:
 Pain Velayat Rural District (Kashmar County)
 Pain Velayat Rural District (Mashhad County)
 Pain Velayat Rural District (Taybad County)
 Pain Velayat Rural District (Torbat-e Heydarieh County)